Jackie Hamilton may refer to:

Jackie Hamilton (1937–2003), British comedian
Jackie Hamilton (ice hockey) (born 1925), Canadian ice hockey player